Boštjan Buč (born 13 April 1980) is a Slovenian retired track athlete who competed in various middle- and long-distance events. He represented Slovenia at the Summer Olympics in 2004 and 2008. He is the Slovenian record holder for the men's 3,000 metres steeplechase.

Running career
Buč entered the international athletics stage as a long-distance runner, and he finished in 85th place of 149 finishers in the junior men's race at the 1999 IAAF World Cross Country Championships. Later on he would use his aerobic base from cross-country running to specialize in the steeplechase. He ran the 3000-metre steeplechase at the 2003 World Championships in Athletics in preparation for next year's Olympics. In the 3000-metre steeplechase at the 2004 Summer Olympics, he finished in 8:37.29, although he did not make it to the final round. He narrowly missed the final round at the 3000-metres steeplechase at the 2008 Summer Olympics, losing the last final round berth to Ion Luchianov.

Achievements

References

External links

 Short Profile

1980 births
Living people
Sportspeople from Celje
Slovenian male middle-distance runners
Slovenian male steeplechase runners
Olympic athletes of Slovenia
Athletes (track and field) at the 2004 Summer Olympics
Athletes (track and field) at the 2008 Summer Olympics
World Athletics Championships athletes for Slovenia